Chen Cheng (陈程) is a Chinese swimmer. At the 2012 Summer Olympics, he competed in the Men's 200 metre breaststroke.

See also
China at the 2012 Summer Olympics - Swimming

References

Year of birth missing (living people)
Living people
Swimmers from Shanghai
Chinese male breaststroke swimmers
Olympic swimmers of China
Swimmers at the 2012 Summer Olympics